Koleh Bid or Kolahbid may refer to:
 Koleh Bid, Hamadan
 Koleh Bid, Markazi